P2X purinoceptor 2 is a protein that in humans is encoded by the P2RX2 gene.

The product of this gene belongs to the family of purinoceptors for ATP. This receptor functions as a cation conducting ligand-gated ion channel. Binding to ATP mediates synaptic transmission between neurons and from neurons to smooth muscle. Six transcript variants encoding six distinct isoforms have been identified for this gene.

See also
 Purinergic receptor

References

Further reading

External links 
 

Ion channels